Constitutional references to God exist in the constitutions of a number of nations, most often in the preamble. A reference to God in a legal text is called invocatio dei ('invocation of God') if the text itself is proclaimed in the name of the deity. A reference to God in another context is called nominatio dei ('naming of God'). Such invocationes and nominationes dei are found notably in several European constitutional traditions (reflecting the strong position of established churches in those countries and the tradition of invoking God in legal documents) and in the constitutions of Islamic countries.

History
Invocationes dei have a long tradition in European legal history outside national constitutions. In ancient times and the Middle Ages, gods or God were normally invoked in contracts to guarantee the agreements made, and formulas such as "In the name of God the Father, the Son and the Holy Spirit" were used at the beginning of legal documents to emphasize the fairness and justness of the created norms. Treaties between Christian nations customarily began with an invocation of God until the late 19th century.

When written constitutions became the norm for modern states in the 19th century, several European states carried this tradition over to their founding documents and then retained it, while others – notably laicist France and states influenced by it – did not do so, so as to preserve the state's religious neutrality. European countries whose constitutions do not make reference to God include Norway (1814), Luxembourg (1868/1972), Iceland (1944/68), Italy (1947), Portugal (1976) and Spain (1978); some of those who do are listed below. In the United States, the federal constitution does not make a reference to God as such, although it uses the formula "the year of our Lord" in Article VII. At the state level, the constitutions of the states of California, Colorado, Florida, Georgia, Illinois, Iowa, Kansas, Kentucky, Louisiana, Maine, Massachusetts, Michigan, Minnesota, New Jersey, New Mexico, Nevada, Pennsylvania, Texas, Wisconsin, and Washington, and the U.S. territory Puerto Rico, make a reference to God. They generally use an invocatio of "God the Almighty" or the "Supreme Ruler of the Universe".

When the newly independent nations of Eastern Europe and Asia adopted new democratic constitutions in the early 1990s following the fall of the Soviet Union and the end of the Eastern Bloc, they took a variety of approaches to the issue of mentioning God:
 The great majority of the new constitutions, including those of all ex-Soviet republics and dependent states except Hungary and Ukraine, make no mention of the supernatural in the preamble (Belarus, Bosnia and Herzegovina, Bulgaria, Estonia, Lithuania, Russia, Slovenia, Serbia and Montenegro), including those rooted in a Muslim background (Kazakhstan, Kyrgyzstan, Tajikistan, Turkmenistan and Uzbekistan), or have no preamble at all (Romania, Latvia, Albania, Armenia and Azerbaijan). Instead, they make reference to secular values such as "liberty, justice and law” (Estonia) or "the generally accepted principles in the modern world" (Croatia). The 2020 amendments to the Constitution of Russia later added a reference to God.
 The preambles to the Constitution of the Czech Republic and of Slovakia do not mention God directly, but refer to the country's "spiritual wealth" (Czech Republic) or to "the spiritual heritage of Cyril and Methodius" (Slovakia).
 Poland's and Ukraine's constitutional preambles contain a nominatio dei (see the list below).

Most recently, the inclusion of a nominatio dei was hotly debated in the preparation of the preamble to the proposed European Constitution. The governments of the member states eventually failed to reach consensus for a reference to Christianity. (See: History of the European Constitution.)

Functions
Invocationes and nominationes dei in constitutions are attributed a number of purposes:

Legitimizing the state: An invocation of God can have the purpose of legitimizing governmental power by declaring it to be exercised according to the will of God rather than, or in addition to, the will of the people. Expressing the divine right of kings was a principal function of invocationes dei in early 19th century monarchic national constitutions, but is no longer an overt purpose of references to God in modern democratic constitutions.
Expressing governmental support for a specific religion: Some authors have nonetheless expressed the view that the nominatio dei in the republican German constitution of 1949 represents the establishment of a specifically Christian state, a "theonomic summit" of the constitution that commits the state to active support of Christian teachings such as in public education. This view is rejected in German constitutional practice.
Challenging the state through reference to suprapositive law and common values: References to a power transcending human authority are seen as a reference to the concept of suprapositive law – that is, norms above and beyond those made by humans ("positive law"), such as divine law or natural law. This is perceived as an acknowledgment of inherent limitations of human law and power, as expressed in Radbruch's formula concerning the relationship between law and justice, or as a rejection of legal positivism altogether. A commitment to inherent limitations of the power of the state over its subjects is also perceived as reflecting a shared commitment to shared values such as human dignity that a state must presuppose rather than establish. Understood in this sense, a reference to God challenges, rather than supports and legitimizes, secular authority.
Anchoring the state in history and tradition: In countries with a long constitutional history and a heritage of shared religious faith, references to God in an otherwise secular constitution have been interpreted as serving a historical function by perpetuating the tradition of invocationes dei of older constitutions and by establishing the general conception of statehood (for instance, Western and Christian) underlying the constitution.

Legal effect
The invocation of God and Jesus in the Preamble of the Constitution of Ireland has been cited in Supreme Court rulings. The concept of natural law has been used to elucidate unenumerated rights. In 1983, Chief Justice Tom O'Higgins, in rejecting David Norris' appeal against the criminalization of buggery in the Offences against the Person Act 1861, stated "It cannot be doubted that the people, so asserting and acknowledging their obligations to our Divine Lord Jesus Christ, were proclaiming a deep religious conviction and faith and an intention to adopt a Constitution consistent with that conviction and faith and with Christian beliefs."  The report of the 1996 Constitutional Review Group recommended amending the preamble to a simple enactment in the name of the people, which would not be cognisable by the courts.

Conversely, in Canada the mention of God in the preamble to the Canadian Charter of Rights and Freedoms has not had much effect.  In considering the legal implications of the preamble in the 1999 case R. v. Sharpe, the British Columbia Court of Appeal referred to it as a "dead letter" which the BC justices had "no authority to breathe life" into.

List

See also
Christian amendment
Christian state

References

Constitutions
Church and state law